Bathurst High School may refer to:

 Bathurst High School (New South Wales), in New South Wales, Australia
 Bathurst High School (New Brunswick), in New Brunswick, Canada